The Asper School of Business is located on the University of Manitoba, Fort Garry Campus in South Winnipeg, Manitoba. The school began in 1937 as the University of Manitoba Faculty of Management. The school was renamed in 2000 in honour of Izzy Asper, noted for his many contributions to the City of Winnipeg and the University of Manitoba over the span of his life.

Programs
The school offers degree programs and courses for undergraduates, as well as to graduates leading to MBA and Ph.D. degrees. The Business school and its MBA program rank within Canada’s Best 10 MBA Programs by Canada Business News.  Its Finance and Accounting programs rank #101 globally by QS Top Universities. The Asper School of Business also offers Executive Programs, an Indigenous Business Education Partners, International Exchange Program and Co-operative Education Program.

Undergraduate Program
Every business student takes the same courses in the core program, but must take four courses to complete a specific major. Each student must also take five business options from any area, so a double major can be completed without taking extra courses.
The majors currently offered are as follows:
 Aboriginal Business Studies
 Accounting (CPA programs available)
 Actuarial Mathematics
 Entrepreneurship/Small Business (Stu Clark Centre for Entrepreneurship)
 Finance
 Generalist (mix of major courses)
 Human Resources Management/Industrial Relations
 International Business
 Leadership and Organizations
 Logistics and Supply Chain Management
 Management Information Systems (MIS)
 Marketing

Graduate Program

Commerce Students' Association
The I.H. Asper School of Business has a student organization called Commerce Students' Association (CSA).

Like all Faculties within the University of Manitoba, the Asper School of Business and Commerce Students' Association 14 other major or subject-area specific student-run organizations for all students attending the Asper School of Business. Some of these organizations are open to students in other Faculties on the University of Manitoba campus. The CSA is student-run with 64 active members including 8 executive members and 56 internal members.

References

 Asper School of Business
 Commerce Students' Association
 University of Manitoba
 Admissions to the University of Manitoba

University of Manitoba
Business schools in Canada
1937 establishments in Manitoba